The following is a list of Arkansas Razorbacks men's basketball head coaches. The Razorbacks have had 13 coaches in their 99-season history.

Arkansas' current head coach is Eric Musselman. He was hired in April 2019 to replace Mike Anderson, who was fired by Arkansas at the end of the 2019 season.

References

Arkansas

Arkansas Razorbacks men's basketball coaches